Michael Colman may refer to:

Mike Colman, ice hockey player
Sir Michael Jeremiah Colman, 3rd Baronet (born 1928) of the Colman baronets

See also
Michael Coleman (disambiguation)
Colman (surname)